Microlophus arenarius is a species of South American lava lizard in the family Tropiduridae. The species is endemic to Peru.

Geographic range
Microlophus arenarius is found in Peru.

References

Microlophus
Lizards of South America
Endemic fauna of Peru
Reptiles of Peru
Reptiles described in 1845
Taxa named by Johann Jakob von Tschudi